Michael P. Winkler is a retired United States Air Force brigadier general who last served as the Director of Strategic Plans, Requirements and Programs of the Pacific Air Forces. Previously, he was the Vice Commander of the Fifth Air Force. After retiring from the Air Force, he joined the Senior Executive Service and will be assigned as the Deputy Director for Air and Cyberspace Operations of the Pacific Air Forces.

References

External links
 

Year of birth missing (living people)
Living people
Place of birth missing (living people)
United States Air Force generals